Adolfus is a genus of lizards of the family Lacertidae. The genus is endemic to subsaharan Africa.

Etymology
The generic name, Adolfus, is in honor of German explorer Duke Adolf Friedrich of Mecklenburg.

Description
The tail is cylindrical, without lateral fringes, and relatively long, about 1.7–2 times SVL. There is no sexual dimorphism. Based on Adolfus jacksoni, the clutch size is 3–5 eggs.

Habitat
Adolfus inhabit forest, forest clearings, and grasslands. A. jacksoni inhabits also urban environments.

Species
The following species are recognized as being valid:
Adolfus africanus 
Adolfus alleni 
Adolfus jacksoni 
Adolfus kibonotensis 
Adolfus masavaensis 
Adolfus mathewsensis 

Nota bene: A binomial authority in parentheses indicates that the species was originally described in a genus other than Adolfus.

References

Further reading
Greenbaum E, Villanueva CO, Kusamba C, Aristote MM, Branch WR (2011). "A molecular phylogeny of Equatorial African Lacertidae, with the description of a new genus and species from eastern Democratic Republic of the Congo". Zoological Journal of the Linnean Society 163: 913–942.
Sternfeld R (1912). "Reptilia". pp. 197–279 + Plates VI-IX. In: Schubotz H (Editor) (1913). Wissenschaftliche Ergebnisse der Deutschen Zentral-Afrika-Expedition 1907-1908 unter Führung Adolf Friedrichs, Herzogs zu Mecklenburg, Band IV [Volume 4], Zoologie II. Leipzig: Klinkhardt & Biermann. 485 pp. + 11 plates. (Adolfus, new genus, p. 220). (in German).

 
Lizard genera
Lacertid lizards of Africa
Taxa named by Richard Sternfeld